The Mayor of Budapest is the head of the General Assembly in Budapest, Hungary, elected directly for 5-year term since 2014 (previously municipal elections were held quadrennially). Until 1994 the mayor was elected by the General Assembly. The office was called Chairman of the Council of Budapest between 1950 and 1990, during the Communist period.

Since 1990, the position is domestically known as Lord Mayor to distinguish the office from that of the mayors that lead each of Budapest's 23 districts. Between 1873 and 1945, the Lord Mayor of Budapest was representative of the Hungarian government as head of the capital's municipal authority, similarly to the Lord-Lieutenants of Counties.

History

Austria-Hungary
The newly elected 400-member General Assembly of Budapest held its inaugural session on 25 October 1873, as a major step in the unification process of Buda and Óbuda on the west bank, with Pest on the east bank of the river Danube. The assembly elected the first Lord Mayor among the three candidates nominated by countersignature of King Francis Joseph I after consultations with the Ministry of Interior. On 30 October 1873, four candidates selected by an election commission headed by Lord Mayor Károly Ráth for the position of Mayor. According to the city unification law (Statute XXXVI of 1872), the Mayor of Budapest was head of the local government, while the Lord Mayor became representative of the executive branch (the government) to establishing a two-tier local government system in Budapest. On 4 November 1873, Károly Kamermayer was elected the first Mayor of Budapest, obtaining 297 votes of the total of 348 votes.

The mayor, the two deputy mayors and the other senior officials were elected for a term of six years by a simple majority of General Assembly. The Law on classification of civil servants (Statute I of 1883) required legal and political science graduate from the office-holder. Consequently, the position was rather administrative than political position during the dual monarchy of Austria-Hungary. Until 1945, the majority of the mayors were civil servants who were passing through the promotion ladder during their careers. The mayor also served as head of the executive council which prepared and presented cases to the General Assembly, and was responsible for financial and property management too. As Chairman of the General Assembly, the Mayor of Budapest also substituted the Lord Mayor in case of obstacles. A lot of administrative scope concentrated in the hands of the mayor (civil registration of births, marriages, citizenship naturalization, authorisation of water management etc.). Thus the administrative system of Budapest was often called as "water-headed". By 1899 some corrections were made: few minor administrative cases assigned to lower-ranking committees and councils. The mayor could exert significant influence through the appointment of the administrative staff, which also depended on the mayor's personality and habit. For instance, Mayor István Bárczy personally directed the affairs of Budapest in practice, while the council meetings gradually became formal.

Interwar period and aftermath
During the dual monarchy, Budapest had much greater autonomy than other towns in countryside, thus the Lord Mayor had much less jurisdiction than Ispáns (or Lord Lieutenants) of the counties. It was because of the restricted suffrage and virilism which secured wide room for maneuver for the upper middle class and the elite senior administrative bureaucracy. This tendency had crucially been changed after the defeat in World War I and the outbreak of the Aster Revolution on 31 October 1918. Budapest became the main scene of revolutionary activity. Following the formation of the Hungarian Soviet Republic in March 1919, Mayor Tivadar Bódy was deposed and the Communist regime set up an Executive Committee to administer the capital city. After the collapse of the Soviet Republic, Admiral Miklós Horthy entered Budapest at the head of the National Army on 16 November 1919. He was greeted by the recurrent Bódy and other city officials in front of the Hotel Gellért. In a fiery speech horthy accused the capital's citizens of betraying Hungary by supporting Bolshevism. On the other hand, after the abolishment of virilism and expansion of suffrage in 1920, a party-based political system has evolved in the General Assembly of Budapest, which became more democratic and liberal than other parts of Hungary.

This phenomenon has caused several jurisdictional conflicts between the Hungarian government and the General Assembly of Budapest during the era of Prime Minister István Bethlen in the 1920s. Both 1920 and 1924 municipal laws sought to limit the capital's autonomy. The most important manifestation of this intention was the expansion of the Lord Mayor's powers, who could initiate the dissolution of the General Assembly after the adoption of that laws. On 1 April 1920, Jenő Sipőcz was appointed Government Commissioner, outranking Mayor Tivadar Bódy. Bethlen's Unity Party was also trying to extend its influence over Károly Wolff's Christian Municipal Party which gained an absolute majority in the 1920 local election in Budapest. The United Municipal Civic Party was founded in 1924 in order to offset Wolff's influence. In practise the party functioned as the Budapest branch of the governing Unity Party.

The Statute XVIII of 1930 completely reorganized Budapest's administrative structure in the spirit of centralization. 32 life members were elected to the General Assembly by an caucus appointed by the Lord Mayor, the government's representative. The government of Gyula Gömbös launched a new offensive against the General Assembly. After the adoption of the Statute XII of 1934, the election result of the position of the Mayor and his two deputies had to be confirmed by the head of state, Regent Miklós Horthy.

Mayors of Budapest (1873–present)

Sources

References

External links
 Budapest korábbi polgármesterei és főpolgármesterei, budapest.hu

 
1873 establishments in Hungary